Michel-Thomas Labrecque (30 December 1849 – 3 Jun 1932) was a Canadian Roman Catholic bishop. He was Bishop of Chicoutimi, Quebec from 1892 to 1927.

References
 Catholic-Hierarchy profile

1849 births
1932 deaths
Roman Catholic bishops of Chicoutimi
19th-century Roman Catholic bishops in Canada
20th-century Roman Catholic bishops in Canada
Academic staff of Université Laval
Roman Catholic bishops of Baie-Comeau